The 2016 Olympic Wrestling Pan American Qualification Tournament was the first regional qualifying tournament for the 2016 Olympics.

The top two wrestlers in each weight class earn a qualification spot for their nation.

Men's freestyle

57 kg
5 March

65 kg
5 March

74 kg
5 March

86 kg
5 March

97 kg
5 March

125 kg
5 March

Men's Greco-Roman

59 kg
6 March

66 kg
6 March

75 kg
6 March

85 kg
6 March

98 kg
6 March

130 kg
6 March

Women's freestyle

48 kg
4 March

53 kg
4 March

58 kg
4 March

63 kg
4 March

69 kg
4 March

75 kg
4 March

References

External links
United World Wrestling

Qualification America
Olympic Q America
2016 Q